Valley View School District 365U (VVSD) is located about 35 miles southwest of downtown Chicago, where Interstates 55 & 355 intersect. The district comprises most of Bolingbrook and Romeoville, Illinois. Formed in 1972, the district serves the educational needs of more than 18,000 students in 20 educational facilities. Valley View School District 365U is one of Will County's largest employers, with more than 2000 full time employees.

Voters have approved several referendums proposals in the past decade, including approval by more than a 67% margin in a $142.3 million referendum in March, 2002. No additional referendums have been requested since 2002. The Equalized Assessed Valuation of the district now stands at more than $2.1 billion. Standard & Poor's (AA-) and Moody's (A1) have both upgraded the district's bond rating in late 2005. This has resulted in a lower bond interest cost for taxpayers. The financial outlook for the next several years remains positive with additional retail and industrial property development, and slowing residential construction occurring in both communities within the district boundaries.

Schools

Early Childhood

Elementary

Middle

High

Alternative

References

External links
https://www.vvsd.org

Bolingbrook, Illinois
Romeoville, Illinois
School districts in Will County, Illinois